Where Do You Hide the Sun? (Arabic:Ayna Tukhabi'un al-Shams?) is a 1977 Egyptian film that addresses the effects of corruption on young people with the solution being adhering to social values. The cast included Egyptians, Libyans and Moroccans.

References
 Amal Sulayman Mahmoud Al-Ubaydi, "Cinema in Libya," in Companion Encyclopedia of Middle Eastern and North African Film ed. Oliver Leaman (London: Routledge, 2001), 414.

External links

1977 drama films
Egyptian drama films
1970s Arabic-language films